North Wall or Northwall may refer to:
 North Wall, Dublin, an inner city area in Ireland
 North Wall railway station, a freight yard complex and former railway station in Dublin, Ireland
 North Wall, Lincolnshire, a tidal defence wall in Grimsby, England
 North Wall Arts Centre, in Oxford, England
 Northwall, a site on Sanday, see List of Sites of Special Scientific Interest in Orkney
 Northwall Firn, a glacier now split in two, 
 East Northwall Firn, a glacier in Papua province, Indonesia
 West Northwall Firn, a glacier in Papua province, Indonesia
 TSS North Wall (1883), a twin-screwed steamer cargo ship
 The North Wall, a war memorial in Ontario, Canada

See also 
 North face (disambiguation)